Ondino Leonel Viera Palasérez (10 September 1901 – 27 June 1997), in Brazil also known as Ondino Vieira, was a Uruguayan football manager. He was the first coach to use a 4-2-4 in Brazil. In his long-lasting career he won between the 1930s and 1960s important titles with clubs in Argentina, Brazil, Uruguay and Paraguay. With the national team of Paraguay he reached second spot at the Copa América of 1963 and at the World Cup of 1966 in England he led Uruguay into the quarterfinals.

He was the manager of the Uruguay national team during the 1966 FIFA World Cup. His son, Milton, was also in the World Cup squad.

In 1967 the United Soccer Association imported entire squads from Europe and South America to play in North America. With Viera as manager, Cerro played as the New York Skyliners.

He also coached Nacional, Fluminense, where he achieved great success and coached the second-most games in club's history, Vasco da Gama and Peñarol.

He was famously quoted as saying "Other countries have their history. Uruguay has its football".

Honours 
 Uruguayan Championship: 1934 (?), 1955, 1956, 1957
 Argentine Primera División: 1936, 1937
 Paraguayan Primera División: 1964
 State Championship of Rio de Janeiro: 1938, 1940, 1941, Torneio Extra 1941, 1945
 Copa América: 1963 (2. Place)

External links 
 Rogério Revelles: Ondino Viera… o futebol como ciência, Tardes de Pacaembu, 2020-06-29

References

1901 births
1997 deaths
Uruguayan football managers
Expatriate football managers in Brazil
Expatriate football managers in Argentina
1966 FIFA World Cup managers
Club Nacional de Football managers
River Plate Montevideo managers
Fluminense FC managers
CR Vasco da Gama managers
Botafogo de Futebol e Regatas managers
Bangu Atlético Clube managers
Sociedade Esportiva Palmeiras managers
Clube Atlético Mineiro managers
Paraguay national football team managers
Club Guaraní managers
C.A. Cerro managers
Uruguay national football team managers
Club Atlético Colón managers
Liverpool F.C. (Montevideo) managers
Peñarol managers
United Soccer Association coaches
L.D.U. Quito managers